Acacia coriacea subsp. pendens, also known as weeping wirewood or leather-leaf wattle, is a subspecies of Acacia coriacea (river jam) that is endemic to the Pilbara region of Western Australia.

See also
List of Acacia species

References

coriacea subsp. pendens
Acacias of Western Australia
Fabales of Australia
Trees of Australia
Plant subspecies
Taxa named by Bruce Maslin